Sok Kwu Wan Public Pier, also known as Sok Kwu Wan Pier, is a public pier located adjacent to Sok Kwu Wan Pier No. 2 on the waterfront of Sok Kwu Wan in Sok Kwu Wan First Street, Lamma Island, Hong Kong. There is only one ferry service provided in the pier, which is the service between Sok Kwu Wan and Aberdeen via Mo Tat Wan, operated by Chuen Kee Ferry.

History
The government developed Lamma Island in 1958. One of the plans was to fund the construction of a pier in Sok Kwu Wan. The project started in December 1958 and was completed in August 1959; But the pier was not officially opened until 17 May 1962.

References

1962 establishments in Hong Kong
Piers in Hong Kong
Lamma Island
Transport infrastructure completed in 1962